A P Varkey Mission Hospital,  is a general hospital owned and operated by CPIM in Arakkunnam, Ernakulam district, Kerala, India. The hospital is named after the former district secretary of CPIM party, late A.P. Varkey. It was established in 2003 and was inaugurated by the Leader of opposition Kerala state assembly V.S. Achuthananthan. The hospital has four major blocks and the latest one was inaugurated by the Health Minister P Sankaran on 5 February 2004. The hospital has all the major departments in clinical and surgical areas.

A P Varkey Mission Nursing School
The A P Varkey Mission Nursing School is also operated from the same campus. It was started on 19 November 2005 and was inaugurated by Mar Thomas Baselios I.

References

Hospitals in Kerala
Buildings and structures in Ernakulam district
Communist Party of India (Marxist)
2003 establishments in Kerala
Hospitals established in 2003